The Ducal Palace of Guastalla (Palazzo Ducale di Guastalla or Palazzo Gonzaga di Guastalla) is an urban Renaissance-style palace in the town of Guastalla, a municipality in the Province of Reggio Emilia,  Emilia-Romagna, Italy.

It was built on the site of a 15th-century palazzo of the Conti Torelli family, and rebuilt in the next century by Francesco Capriana (Francesco da Volterra), under commission to the Count of Guastalla, Cesare I Gonzaga. Neglected for years, it is currently a museum of the city. It contains art works from antique Roman cemeteries, paintings from deconsecrated chapels and oratories, as well as an exhibit of the modern watercolor painters Mario Bolzoni.

References

Palaces in Reggio Emilia
Renaissance architecture in Emilia-Romagna
Museums in Emilia-Romagna
Gonzaga residences
Duchy of Guastalla
Guastalla